In computer science, separation of concerns is a design principle for separating a computer program into distinct sections. Each section addresses a separate concern, a set of information that affects the code of a computer program. A concern can be as general as "the details of the hardware for an application", or as specific as "the name of which class to instantiate". A program that embodies SoC well is called a modular program. Modularity, and hence separation of concerns, is achieved by encapsulating information inside a section of code that has a well-defined interface. Encapsulation is a means of information hiding. Layered designs in information systems are another embodiment of separation of concerns (e.g., presentation layer, business logic layer, data access layer, persistence layer).

Separation of concerns results in more degrees of freedom for some aspect of the program's design, deployment, or usage. Common among these is increased freedom for simplification and maintenance of code. When concerns are well-separated, there are more opportunities for module upgrade, reuse, and independent development. Hiding the implementation details of modules behind an interface enables improving or modifying a single concern's section of code without having to know the details of other sections and without having to make corresponding changes to those other sections. Modules can also expose different versions of an interface, which increases the freedom to upgrade a complex system in piecemeal fashion without interim loss of functionality.

Separation of concerns is a form of abstraction. As with most abstractions, separating concerns means adding additional code interfaces, generally creating more code to be executed. So despite the many benefits of well-separated concerns, there is often an associated execution penalty.

Implementation 
The mechanisms for modular or object-oriented programming that are provided by a programming language are mechanisms that allow developers to provide SoC.  For example, object-oriented programming languages such as C#, C++, Delphi, and Java can separate concerns into objects, and architectural design patterns like MVC or MVP can separate presentation and the data-processing (model) from content. Service-oriented design can separate concerns into services. Procedural programming languages such as C and Pascal can separate concerns into procedures or functions. Aspect-oriented programming languages can separate concerns into aspects and objects.

Separation of concerns is an important design principle in many other areas as well, such as urban planning, architecture and information design. The goal is to more effectively understand, design, and manage complex interdependent systems, so that functions can be reused, optimized independently of other functions, and insulated from the potential failure of other functions.

Common examples include separating a space into rooms, so that activity in one room does not affect people in other rooms, and keeping the stove on one circuit and the lights on another, so that overload by the stove does not turn the lights off. The example with rooms shows encapsulation, where information inside one room, such as how messy it is, is not available to the other rooms, except through the interface, which is the door. The example with circuits demonstrates that activity inside one module, which is a circuit with consumers of electricity attached, does not affect activity in a different module, so each module is not concerned with what happens in the other.

Origin 
The term separation of concerns was probably coined by Edsger W. Dijkstra in his 1974 paper "On the role of scientific thought".

Fifteen years later, it was evident the term  was becoming an accepted idea. In 1989, Chris Reade wrote a book titled Elements of Functional Programming that describes separation of concerns:

Reade continues to say,

Examples

Internet protocol stack 
Separation of concerns is crucial to the design of the Internet. In the Internet Protocol Suite, great efforts have been made to separate concerns into well-defined layers. This allows protocol designers to focus on the concerns in one layer, and ignore the other layers. The Application Layer protocol SMTP, for example, is concerned about all the details of conducting an email session over a reliable transport service (usually TCP), but not in the least concerned about how the transport service makes that service reliable. Similarly, TCP is not concerned about the routing of data packets, which is handled at the Internet Layer.

HTML, CSS, JavaScript 
HyperText Markup Language (HTML), Cascading Style Sheets (CSS), and JavaScript (JS) are complementary languages used in the development of web pages and websites. HTML is mainly used for organization of webpage content, CSS is used for definition of content presentation style, and JS defines how the content interacts and behaves with the user. Historically, this was not the case: prior to the introduction of CSS, HTML performed both duties of defining semantics and style.

Subject-oriented programming 
Subject-oriented programming allows separate concerns to be addressed as separate software constructs, each on an equal footing with the others. Each concern provides its own class-structure into which the objects in common are organized, and contributes state and methods to the composite result where they cut across one another. Correspondence rules describe how the classes and methods in the various concerns are related to each other at points where they interact, allowing composite behavior for a method to be derived from several concerns. Multi-dimensional separation of concerns allows the analysis and composition of concerns to be manipulated as a multi-dimensional "matrix" in which each concern provides a dimension in which different points of choice are enumerated, with the cells of the matrix occupied by the appropriate software artifacts.

Aspect-oriented programming 
Aspect-oriented programming allows cross-cutting concerns to be addressed as primary concerns. For example, most programs require some form of security and logging. Security and logging are often secondary concerns, whereas the primary concern is often on accomplishing business goals. However, when designing a program, its security must be built into the design from the beginning instead of being treated as a secondary concern. Applying security afterwards often results in an insufficient security model that leaves too many gaps for future attacks. This may be solved with aspect-oriented programming. For example, an aspect may be written to enforce that calls to a certain API are always logged, or that errors are always logged when an exception is thrown, regardless of whether the program's procedural code handles the exception or propagates it.

Levels of analysis in artificial intelligence 
In cognitive science and artificial intelligence, it is common to refer to David Marr's levels of analysis.  At any given time, a researcher may be focusing on (1) what some aspect of intelligence needs to compute, (2) what algorithm it employs, or (3) how that algorithm is implemented in hardware.  This separation of concerns is similar to the interface/implementation distinction in software and hardware engineering.

Normalized systems 

In normalized systems separation of concerns is one of the four guiding principles. Adhering to this principle is one of the tools that helps reduce the combinatorial effects that, over time, get introduced in software that is being maintained. In Normalized Systems separation of concerns is actively supported by the tools.

SoC via partial classes 
Separation of concerns can be implemented and enforced via partial classes.

SoC via partial classes in Ruby 
bear_hunting.rb
class Bear
  def hunt
    forest.select(&:food?)
  end
end
bear_eating.rb
class Bear
  def eat(food)
    raise "#{food} is not edible!" unless food.respond_to? :nutrition_value
    food.nutrition_value
  end
end
bear_hunger.rb
class Bear
  attr_accessor :hunger
  def monitor_hunger
    if hunger > 50
      food = hunt
      hunger -= eat(food)
    end
  end
end

See also 

 Abstraction principle (programming)
 Aspect-oriented software development
 Concern (computer science)
 Coupling (computer science)
 Holism
 Modular design
 Modular programming
 
 Single-responsibility principle

References

External links 
 Multi-Dimensional Separation of Concerns
 TAOSAD
 Tutorial and Workshop on Aspect-Oriented Programming and Separation of Concerns

Programming principles
Reductionism